David Marques Pereira da Silva (born 12 January 1992) aka Matthew Silva, was a Portuguese footballer who played as midfielder.

Football career
On 21 January 2013, Silva made his professional debut with Anagennisi Epanomi in a 2012–13 Greek Football League match against Iraklis Thessaloniki.

Personal
Matthew Silva is the younger brother of Joshua Silva, also a professional footballer.

References

External links

Stats and profile at LPFP 

1992 births
Living people
Portuguese footballers
Association football midfielders
Liga Portugal 2 players
National League (English football) players
Football League (Greece) players
S.C. Farense players
Whitehawk F.C. players
SV Elversberg players
Expatriate footballers in Greece
Expatriate footballers in England
Expatriate footballers in Germany
Portuguese expatriate footballers